Danny Dunn and the Swamp Monster is the twelfth novel in the Danny Dunn series of juvenile science fiction/adventure books written by Raymond Abrashkin and Jay Williams. The book was first published in 1971.

Plot introduction 
Professor Bullfinch and Doctor Grimes take Danny and his friends to the beginning of the Nile River in Africa to investigate local legends of a swamp monster. Despite unforeseen calamities, a new, rare species of electric catfish is discovered..

Editions 
McGraw-Hill
 Paperback, 1971, illustrated by Paul Sagsoorian
 Hardback, 1971, illustrated by Paul Sagsoorian

MacDonald and Jane's
  (Hardback, 1972, illustrated by Anne Mieke

Archway Books
 Paperback, 1979, #6 in their series

Pocket Books
 Paperback, 1983 reissue, illustrated by Paul Sagsoorian

Danny Dunn
1971 American novels
1971 children's books
1971 science fiction novels
Novels set in Africa